The United States Space Force's 5th Space Launch Squadron is a space launch unit located at Patrick Space Force Base, Florida. The 5th SLS is tasked with launch and support of the Evolved Expendable Launch Vehicles.

History
The 5th Space Launch Squadron was activated on 14 April 1994 at Cape Canaveral Air Force Station, Florida as part of the 45th Space Wing.  The squadron conducted Titan IV booster launch operations, launching classified military payloads into orbit until it was inactivated in June 1998.

The squadron was reactivated on 1 December 2003, and has supervised launched of commercial space boosters from Cape Canaveral since then.

Lineage
 Constituted as the 5th Space Launch Squadron on 29 March 1994
 Activated on 14 April 1994
 Inactivated on 29 June 1998
 Activated on 1 December 2003

Assignments
 45th Operations Group, 14 April 1994 – 29 June 1998
 45th Launch Group, 1 December 2003 – present

Stations
 Cape Canaveral Air Force Station, Florida, 14 April 1994 – 29 June 1998
 Cape Canaveral Space Force Station, Florida, 1 December 2003 – present

Launch vehicles
 Titan IV, 1994-1998
 Delta IV, 2003-present
 Atlas V, 2003-present

References

Notes

Bibliography

Squadrons of the United States Space Force
Military units and formations in Florida
Military units and formations established in 1994